The Las Vegas Raiders Radio Network is an American radio network composed of 52 radio stations which carry English-language coverage of the Las Vegas Raiders, a professional football team in the National Football League (NFL). Las Vegas market stations KRLV (920 AM) and KOMP (92.3 FM) serve as the network's two flagships. The network also includes 50 affiliates in the U.S. states of Nevada, California, Alaska, Arizona, Hawaii, Kansas, Minnesota, New Mexico, Oregon, Texas and Utah: 34 AM stations, sixteen of which supplement their signals with a low-power FM translator and one repeated over an HD Radio FM digital subchannel; and 16 full-power FM stations, four of which supplement their signals with a low-power FM translator. Jason Horowitz is the current play-by-play announcer, while Lincoln Kennedy serves as color commentator; George Atkinson and Jim Plunkett offer pre- and post-game commentary. Compass Media Networks is responsible for producing and distributing the network to these aforementioned terrestrial radio stations. 

Complementing this coverage, Las Vegas market station KENO (1460 AM) serves as the flagship of a secondary radio network carrying Spanish-language coverage of the Raiders. This network includes 8 affiliates in the U.S. states of Nevada and California: 5 AM stations and 3 FM stations. Cristián Echeverría is the current Spanish-language play-by-play announcer with Harry Ruiz serving as color commentator. 

In addition to traditional over-the-air AM and FM broadcasts, network programming airs on SiriusXM satellite radio; and streams online via SiriusXM Internet Radio, TuneIn Premium, and NFL+.

History
From 2004 to 2009, the flagship was KSFO (560 AM) in San Francisco with a network of thirty radio stations in Hawaii, Oregon, Nevada, New Mexico, and British Columbia. During most of the 1970s, KGO (810 AM) was the flagship station. 

Bill King—the "Voice of the Raiders"—called the Oakland/Los Angeles Raiders from 1966 to 1992. He called approximately 600 games. The Raiders awarded him all three rings. King left after the 1992 season. It's Bill's radio audio heard on most of the NFL Films highlight footage of the Raiders. King's color men in Oakland included former San Francisco 49ers tight end Monty Stickles and Scotty Stirling, a sports writer for the Oakland Tribune. Many of the years, KGO 810 did promos as "Raider Radio 81". King's call of the Holy Roller has been labeled (by Chris Berman, among others) as one of 5 best in NFL history. King died in October 2005 from complications after surgery. Scotty Stirling, an Oakland Tribune sportswriter, served as the "color man" with King. The Raider games were called on radio from 1960 to 1962 by Bud (Wilson Keene) Foster and Mel Venter and from 1963 to 1965 by Bob Blum and Dan Galvin.

Until their dismissal prior to the 2018 season, Greg Papa was the voice of the Raiders with former Raiders quarterback and head coach Tom Flores doing commentary from 1997 until 2017. From 2018 until 2022, Brent Musburger was the voice of the Raiders.

Station list

Asterisk (*) indicates HD Radio broadcast.
Blue background indicates low-power FM translator.

Spanish-language stations

 **Station has a concession from the IFT to serve Tijuana, Baja California, Mexico, but services the San Diego–Tijuana market.

References

External links
 Raiders Radio Network
 SiriusXM.com: Las Vegas Raiders
 TuneIn.com: Las Vegas Raiders
 NFL Game Pass

 
Las Vegas Raiders
Las Vegas Raiders
National Football League on the radio
Las Vegas Raiders lists